San Cayetano Partido is a partido of Buenos Aires Province in Argentina.

Name

The partido and its cabecera (capital) are named after San Cayetano, a Catholic Saint (1480-1547). In Argentina, he is known as patrón del trabajo, translated as the patron saint of work in English.

Settlements

 Balneario San Cayetano
 Cristiano Muerto
 El Carretero
 San Cayetano
 Lumb
 Deferrari
 Ochandio

External links
Municipal site (Spanish)

1954 establishments in Argentina
Partidos of Buenos Aires Province